Raja Sakhi Daler Khan (or Sakhi Delair Khan) was born in the village of Sarsawa, Kotli in the year 1928. He led Pakistani troops and irregulars in the Indo-Pakistani War of 1947.  Due to his major role in the liberation of the Poonch valley regions of Azad Jammu and Kashmir, the village of Sarsawa was subsequently renamed Sakhi Delair Abad in his honour.

Military career
Raja Sakhi Delair Khan joined the Indian National Army. He resigned from his post and joined the All-India Muslim League on June 6, 1946. League leader Mohammad Ali Jinnah requested that he file a report about the current situation of the state of Jammu and Kashmir. Khan visited the Chief Minister of Jammu and Kashmir, Ram Chandra Kak and the last ruling Maharrajah, Maharaja Hari Singh, to better understand their views on whether Jammu and Kashmir should join with Pakistan as laid out in the British proposal for post-Independence India and Pakistan. He reported back to Jinnah at his residence at Aurang Zaib Road, Delhi in 1946 that an alternative plan was required to liberate Jammu and Kashmir. Khan tried to organise army veterans and recruit them for the fighting for Jammu and Kashmir by showing them a circular signed by Jinnah establishing a War Council on September 5, 1947. Following this,  Khan led many battles against the Dogra forces that were currently in control of the area, particularly in Kotli District and Rajouri District.
Under the leadership of Raja Sakhi Daler Khan the Muslims of Rajouri rose against the Dogra rulers and took Rajouri.  Rajouri was subsequently subject to a heavy armed assault lasting several days by the Fiftieth Parachute Brigade, the Eightieth Brigade, and the 19th Indian Infantry Brigade supported by tanks of the Central Indian Horse.  Rajouri fell under control of Indian forces on 12 April 1948, becoming part of the Indian state Jammu and Kashmir.

Decorations
The War Council awarded Khan the following honours:

 Fath-e-Kotli    (Liberator of Kotli)
 Fakhr-e-Kashmir (Honour of Kashmir)
 Ghazi-e-Kashmir (Warrior of Kashmir)
 Khadam-e-Din    (Servant of the Deen)
 Commander in Chief,  Tehreek-e-Azaadi
 Chief Convenor, Jammu and Kashmir Historical Committee

References

Bibliography

 Tarekh-e-Kotli Mangralan, Raja Sarfraz Ahmad Khan Mangral
 Shohaab Nama, Qudarat-ulah-Shohaab
 The Bleeding Kashmir, Major Iqbal Hashmi
 Mirpur Before 1947, Sayad Sultan Shah
 The Kashmir, Khalid Mehmood Kokhar Adocate Kotli
 Maghribi Jammu Main Jang-e-Azadi, M. Latif

Date of birth missing (living people)
1928 births
Living people